Huskisson is a civil parish in Kent County, New Brunswick, Canada.

For governance purposes the northern part of the parish is within the village of Five Rivers while most belongs to the Kent rural district; both are members of the Kent Regional Service Commission.

Prior to the 2023 governance reform, the parish was part of the local service district of the parish of Harcourt. References to an LSD of Huskisson on provincial governance reforms maps are erroneous.

Origin of name
The parish was named in honour of William Huskisson, President of the Board of Trade at the time of its erection and one of the plenipotentiaries of boundary negotiations with the United States in 1826.

Addington Parish was named at the same time for the other British plenipotentiary, Henry Unwin Addington.

History
In 1827 Huskisson was erected from unassigned territory north of the Richibucto River, comprising a shallower area than it has today.

In 1850 the southern boundary was altered to run due west from its starting point. to include an area annexed by the county in 1845.

Boundaries
Huskisson Parish is bounded:

on the west and northwest by the Northumberland County line;
on the east by a line running north 22º west, based on the magnet of 1867, from a point on the Westmorland County line twenty miles (32.2 kilometres) west of the northern tip of Shediac Island;
on the south by a line running due east and west from the mouth of Jimmy Graham Fork on the Richibucto River.

Communities
Communities at least partly within the parish;
Mortimer

Bodies of water
Bodies of water at least partly in the parish:

Kouchibouguacis River
Richibucto River
Sabbies River
Big Forks Stream
Little Forks Stream
Hector Fork
Jimmy Graham Fork
Johnny Graham Fork
North Forks
South Forks
Big Forks Lake
Despres Lake
Lake Francis
McLain Lake
Meadow Lake
Sabbies Lake

Demographics

Population
Population trend

Language
Mother tongue language (2006)

See also
List of parishes in New Brunswick

Notes

References

Parishes of Kent County, New Brunswick